William "Willie" Spencer (November 11, 1895 – October 2, 1963) was a naturalized American professional bicycle racer in the early 1900s. A world record holder for the quarter mile, he also won the American Sprint Championship three times.

History
The English-born Spencer entered the world of professional bicycle racing in 1916. He had several significant victories in his early years, including twice placing 4th in the American Sprint Championship, before he was drafted for six months of service in the United States Army. After his release in January 1919, Spencer continued racing, clocking victories around the world and, in 1920, setting a world record while racing in Australia for doing  in 25 seconds. In 1922, 1923 and 1926, he won the American Sprint Championship. Spencer became an American citizen in 1947. He was inducted into the United States Bicycling Hall of Fame in 2005.

References

1895 births
1963 deaths
American male cyclists
American track cyclists
British emigrants to the United States